Nia Sifaatihii Ali (born October 23, 1988) is an American track and field athlete, who specializes in the 100 m hurdles, heptathlon, and other events.

She is the 2016 Olympic Silver Medalist in the 100-meter hurdles, the 2019 World champion in the 100-meter hurdles, and twice in a row world indoor champion (2014 Sopot and 2016 Portland) in 60 meters hurdles.

Early life
Raised in the Germantown section of Philadelphia, Ali moved to Pleasantville, New Jersey for her senior year and graduated from Pleasantville High School in 2006.

Career

NCAA
In college Ali was the 2011 NCAA leader and NCAA champion for the USC Trojans in the 100 m hurdles in a time of (2.1w) 12.63. Ali formerly competed for the Tennessee Volunteers (then the Lady Volunteers) where she was Southeastern Conference champion in the heptathlon and at USC she was an All-American in the heptathlon.

Professional

Ali was selected to represent the U.S. in Shenzhen, China for the World University Games where she won the Gold Medal in a time of 12.85.

At the 2013 USA Outdoor Track and Field Championships Ali took third in the 100 m hurdles to qualify for the 2013 World Championships in Athletics. At the World Championships, Ali was a semi-finalist in the 100 m hurdles, ultimately finishing 10th.

At the 2014 USA Outdoor Track and Field Championships Ali took eighth in the 100 m hurdles.

She won the 60 meters hurdles at the 2013 USA Indoor Track and Field Championships in Albuquerque, New Mexico in a personal best of 7.93 and repeated the year later with a new personal best of 7.80, which also qualified her for the 2014 World Indoor Championships where she took the gold medal running 7.80 a second time.

In 2015, Nia took a year off to give birth to her son with hurdler Michael Tinsley.

She returned to the 2016 World Indoor Championships to successfully defend her gold medal.  After winning, she carried her son on the victory lap.

Ali placed third in the 100 hurdles in a time of 12.55 at the 2016 United States Olympic Trials behind Team USA teammates Brianna Rollins, Kristi Castlin to qualify to represent the United States at the 2016 Summer Olympics in Brazil. Later that year she won the silver medal at the Olympics. The United States was the first country to win gold, silver, and bronze in the women's 100 hurdles in one Olympics in 2016; this was also the first time American women achieved such a sweep in any Olympic track and field event.

In 2019, Nia won the gold-medal for 100m hurdles at the  IAAF world championships (DOHA, Qatar)  with a personal-best time of 12.34. The time ties her with Sharika Nelvis as the #9 performer of all time.

Personal life
Nia has a son, Titus Maximus, with American Olympian Michael Tinsley, an American track and field athlete specializing in the 400 metres hurdles. In June 2018, she had a daughter with her partner, Canadian Olympic sprinter Andre De Grasse, and a second child in May 2021.

References

External links

 
 
 
 

1988 births
Living people
American female hurdlers
Pleasantville High School (New Jersey) alumni
USC Trojans women's track and field athletes
Tennessee Volunteers women's track and field athletes
Track and field athletes from California
Athletes (track and field) at the 2016 Summer Olympics
People from Pleasantville, New Jersey
Medalists at the 2016 Summer Olympics
Olympic silver medalists for the United States in track and field
Universiade medalists in athletics (track and field)
African-American female track and field athletes
Universiade gold medalists for the United States
World Athletics Championships athletes for the United States
World Athletics Championships medalists
World Athletics Championships winners
USA Indoor Track and Field Championships winners
World Athletics Indoor Championships winners
21st-century African-American sportspeople
21st-century African-American women
20th-century African-American people
20th-century African-American women